This is a list of Maltese football transfers for the 2010–11 winter transfer window by club. Only transfers of clubs in the Maltese Premier League and Maltese First Division are included.

The winter transfer window opened on 1 January 2011, although a few transfers may take place prior to that date. The window closed at midnight on 31 January 2011. Players without a club may join one at any time, either during or in between transfer windows.

Maltese Premier League

Birkirkara

In:

 
 

Out:

Floriana

In:

 
 
 
 

Out:

Ħamrun Spartans

In:

 
 

Out:

Hibernians

In:

 

Out:

Marsaxlokk

In:

 

Out:

Qormi

In:

Out:

Sliema Wanderers

In:

Out:

Tarxien Rainbows

In:

Out:

Valletta

In:

 

Out:

Vittoriosa Stars

In:

 

Out:

Maltese First Division

Balzan Youths

In:

Out:

Dingli Swallows

In:

Out:

Lija Athletic

In:

Out:

Melita

In:

Out:

Mosta

In:

 

Out:

Mqabba

In:

Out:

Msida Saint-Joseph

In:

 

Out:

Pietà Hotspurs

In:

Out:

St. Andrews

In:

Out:

St. George's

In:

Out:

Manager Transfers

References

External links
 Official Website

Maltese
Transfers
2010-11